is a joint-use passenger railway station in the city of Mito, Ibaraki, Japan, operated by the East Japan Railway Company (JR East) and the third sector Kashima Rinkai Railway. The station premises are managed by JR East.

Lines
Mito Station is served by the JR East Jōban Line and Suigun Line, and also by the Kashima Rinkai Railway's Ōarai-Kashima Line. It is located 115.3 km from the official starting point of the Jōban Line at Nippori Station and is a terminus of the Suigun Line and of the Ōarai-Kashima Line.

Station layout

The station consists of four island platforms serving eight tracks. The station has a Midori no Madoguchi staffed ticket office and a "View Plaza" travel agency.

Platforms

History

Mito station opened on the Mito Line on 16 January 1889. The Suigun Line opened on 16 November 1897. The station was absorbed into the JR East network upon the privatization of the Japanese National Railways (JNR) on 1 April 1987. A new station building was completed in July 1994.

The Kashima Rinkai Tetsudo Ōarai-Kashima Line opened on 14 March 1985.

Passenger statistics
In fiscal 2019, the JR East portion of the station was used by an average of 29,172 passengers daily (boarding passengers only). In fiscal 2019, the Kashima Rinkai Railway portion of the station was used by an average of 2064 passengers daily.

The passenger figures (boarding passengers only) for previous years are as shown below.

Surrounding area
 Kōdōkan
 Art Tower Mito

See also
 List of railway stations in Japan

References

External links

 Mito Station information (JR East) 
Kashima Rinkai Railway Station Information 

Railway stations in Ibaraki Prefecture
Jōban Line
Mito, Ibaraki
Railway stations in Japan opened in 1889